UNCG Baseball Stadium is a baseball venue located in Greensboro, North Carolina, United States.  It is home to the UNC Greensboro Spartans college baseball team of the Division I Southern Conference.  It has a capacity of 3,500 spectators and opened in 1999.

The venue opened on February 12, 1999, for a game against George Washington.  The game was played in front of a crowd of 1,835 spectators.

Features
It cost $5.4 million to build.

Features of the venue include a press box, PA system, concessions, offices, lights, a drainage system, dugouts, and a scoreboard.  889 permanent seats and additional berm seating make up a seating capacity of approximately 3,500.

Renovations
In 2006, a new scoreboard was installed at the stadium.  It includes a videoboard, which shows live statistics during games.

Praise
In 2012, John Manuel of Baseball America called the stadium "one of the best mid-major ballparks in the Southeast."  In the same year, writer Eric Sorenson ranked the stadium the second best small venue in Division I baseball.

See also
 List of NCAA Division I baseball venues

References

UNC Greensboro Spartans baseball
UNC Greensboro Spartans sports venues
College baseball venues in the United States
Baseball venues in North Carolina
Sports venues in Guilford County, North Carolina
1999 establishments in North Carolina
Sports venues completed in 1999